The 2015 FC Aktobe season is the 15th successive season that the club will play in the Kazakhstan Premier League, the highest tier of association football in Kazakhstan. Aktobe will also play in the Kazakhstan Cup and the Europa League.

Squad

Transfers

Winter

In:

Out:

Summer

In:

Out:

Competitions

Kazakhstan Premier League

First round

Results summary

Results by round

Results

League table

Championship round

Results summary

Results by round

Results

League table

Kazakhstan Cup

UEFA Europa League

Qualifying rounds

Squad statistics

Appearances and goals

|-
|colspan="14"|Players away from Aktobe on loan:
|-
|colspan="14"|Players who appeared for Aktobe that left during the season:

|}

Goal scorers

Disciplinary record

References

External links

Aktobe
Aktobe
FC Aktobe seasons